Jutaro Nakao  (born November 30, 1970) is a Japanese mixed martial artist. He competes in both the Lightweight and Welterweight divisions.

A judo based fighter, Nakao is known for his chiseled physique and high defensive abilities on the ring, being difficult to finish off by his opponents. He is also famous for his prowess with the triangle choke, having received the nickname of "King of Triangle" by the Japanese press due to his multiple victories through said technique.

He is also one of the few fighters who have a legal win through the popularly called "rape choke" or two-handed stranglehold, after defeating Thomas Denny with it.

Mixed martial arts record

|-
| Loss
| align=center| 26-20–4
| Yoshitomo Watanabe
| Decision (unanimous)
| Deep - Cage Impact 2018 in Osaka
| 
| align=center| 3
| align=center| 5:00
| Osaka, Japan
|
|-
| Win
| align=center| 26–19–4
| Yuki Kondo
| TKO (punches)
| Pancrase / Deep - Pancrase vs. Deep: Osaka
| 
| align=center| 2
| align=center| 0:57
| Amagasaki, Japan
|
|-
| Loss
| align=center| 25–19–4
| Ryuichiro Sumimura
| Decision (unanimous)
| Deep - Cage Impact 2015 in Osaka
| 
| align=center| 3
| align=center| 5:00
| Osaka, Japan
|
|-
| Win
| align=center| 25–18–4
| Hidetora Hidetora
| Decision (unanimous)
| Deep - Cage Impact 2014 in Osaka
| 
| align=center| 3
| align=center| 5:00
| Osaka, Japan
|
|-
| Loss
| align=center| 24–18–4
| Katsunori Kikuno
| KO (punch)
| Deep - Cage Impact 2013
| 
| align=center| 1
| align=center| 1:07
| Tokyo, Japan
|
|-
| Win
| align=center| 24–17–4
| Doo Jae Jeong
| Submission (armbar)
| Deep - Osaka Impact 2012
| 
| align=center| 1
| align=center| 4:13
| Osaka, Japan
|
|-
| Loss
| align=center| 23–17–4
| Yasuaki Kishimoto
| Decision (unanimous)	
| Deep: Osaka Impact
| 
| align=center| 3
| align=center| 5:00
| Osaka, Japan	
| 
|-
| Loss
| align=center| 23–16–4
| Satoru Kitaoka	
| Decision (unanimous)	
| Deep: 53 Impact
| 
| align=center| 3
| align=center| 5:00
| Osaka, Japan
| 
|-
| Win
| align=center| 23–15–4
| Yuki Ito
| Decision (unanimous)
| Deep: 45 Impact
| 
| align=center| 3
| align=center| 5:00
| Osaka, Japan
| 
|-
| Loss
| align=center| 22–15–4
| Ryo Chonan
| Decision (unanimous)
| Deep: 43 Impact
| 
| align=center| 3
| align=center| 5:00
| Tokyo, Japan
| 
|-
| Loss
| align=center| 22–14–4
| Koichiro Matsumoto
| Decision (unanimous)
| Deep: 40 Impact
| 
| align=center| 3
| align=center| 5:00
| Tokyo, Japan
| 
|-
| Win
| align=center| 22–13–4
| Yong Fun Lee
| TKO (punches)
| Deep: Gladiator
| 
| align=center| 2
| align=center| 2:26
| Tokyo, Japan
| 
|-
| Win
| align=center| 21–13–4
| Shigetoshi Iwase
| Decision (unanimous)
| Deep: 35 Impact
| 
| align=center| 2
| align=center| 5:00
| Tokyo, Japan
| 
|-
| Loss
| align=center| 20–13–4
| Tae Hyun Bang
| TKO (punches)
| Deep: 33 Impact
| 
| align=center| 2
| align=center| 1:15
| Tokyo, Japan
| 
|-
|  Draw
| align=center| 20–12–4
| Kiuma Kunioku
| Draw
| Deep: 30 Impact
| 
| align=center| 3
| align=center| 5:00
| Osaka, Japan
| 
|-
| Loss
| align=center| 20–12–3
| Hidehiko Hasegawa
| Decision (majority)
| Deep: 28 Impact
| 
| align=center| 3
| align=center| 5:00
| Tokyo, Japan
| Lost Deep Welterweight Title
|-
| Loss
| align=center| 20–11–3
| Fabricio Monteiro
| Decision (unanimous)
| Deep: 26 Impact
| 
| align=center| 3
| align=center| 5:00
| Tokyo, Japan
| 
|-
| Win
| align=center| 20–10–3
| Kousei Kubota
| TKO (soccer kicks)
| Deep: 25 Impact
| 
| align=center| 2
| align=center| 2:08
| Tokyo, Japan
| 
|-
| Win
| align=center| 19–10–3
| Seichi Ikemoto
| Decision (majority)
| Real Rhythm - 3rd Stage
| 
| align=center| 3
| align=center| 5:00
| Osaka, Japan
| Defended Deep Welterweight Title
|-
|  Draw
| align=center| 18–10–3
| Won Jin Eoh
| Draw
| Deep: 20th Impact
| 
| align=center| 3
| align=center| 5:00
| Tokyo, Japan
| 
|-
| Loss
| align=center| 18–10–2
| Marcus Aurélio
| Decision (unanimous)
| Pride: Bushido 8
| 
| align=center| 2
| align=center| 5:00
| Nagoya, Japan
| 
|-
| Win
| align=center| 18–9–2
| Kyosuke Sasaki
| Decision (unanimous)
| Real Rhythm - 1st Stage
| 
| align=center| 3
| align=center| 5:00
| Osaka, Japan
| 
|-
| Win
| align=center| 17–9–2
| Daisuke Nakamura
| TKO (punches)
| Deep: 16th Impact
| 
| align=center| 3
| align=center| 3:16
| Tokyo, Japan
| Won Deep Welterweight Title
|-
| Win
| align=center| 16–9–2
| Shinya Aoki
| KO (punch)
| Deep: 16th Impact
| 
| align=center| 1
| align=center| 4:29
| Tokyo, Japan
| 
|-
| Win
| align=center| 15–9–2
| Kenji Arai
| Submission (triangle choke)
| Deep: 15th Impact
| 
| align=center| 1
| align=center| 4:04
| Tokyo, Japan
| 
|-
| Loss
| align=center| 14–9–2
| Akira Kikuchi
| Decision (majority)
| Shooto 2004: 5/3 in Korakuen Hall
| 
| align=center| 3
| align=center| 5:00
| Tokyo, Japan
| 
|-
| Win
| align=center| 14–8–2
| Sauli Heilimo
| Submission (reverse triangle choke)
| Shooto - 7/13 in Korakuen Hall
| 
| align=center| 2
| align=center| 0:39
| Tokyo, Japan
| 
|-
| Win
| align=center| 13–8–2
| Deshaun Johnson
| Submission (keylock)
| SB 27 - SuperBrawl 27
| 
| align=center| 1
| align=center| 4:53
| Honolulu, Hawaii, United States
| 
|-
| Loss
| align=center| 12–8–2
| Sean Sherk
| Decision (unanimous)
| UFC 36
| 
| align=center| 3
| align=center| 5:00
| Paradise, Nevada, United States
| 
|-
| Win
| align=center| 12–7–2
| Takuya Wada
| Submission (triangle choke)
| Shooto - To The Top Final Act
| 
| align=center| 1
| align=center| 4:07
| Tokyo, Japan
| 
|-
| Win
| align=center| 11–7–2
| Tony DeSouza
| KO (punch)
| UFC 33
| 
| align=center| 2
| align=center| 0:15
| Paradise, Nevada, United States
| 
|-
| Win
| align=center| 10–7–2
| LaVerne Clark
| Technical Submission (triangle choke)
| HOOKnSHOOT - Masters
| 
| align=center| 3
| align=center| 3:50
| Evansville, Indiana, United States
| 
|-
| Win
| align=center| 9–7–2
| Thomas Denny
| Submission (front strangle choke)
| Shooto - To The Top 2
| 
| align=center| 3
| align=center| 3:09
| Tokyo, Japan
| 
|-
|  Draw
| align=center| 8–7–2
| Steve Berger
| Draw
| HOOKnSHOOT - Fusion
| 
| align=center| 3
| align=center| 5:00
| Evansville, Indiana, United States
| 
|-
| Loss
| align=center| 8–7–1
| Dan Gilbert
| TKO (doctor)
| Shooto - R.E.A.D. 8
| 
| align=center| 3
| align=center| 4:02
| Osaka, Japan
| 
|-
| Loss
| align=center| 8–6–1
| Ray Cooper
| Decision (unanimous)
| Shooto - R.E.A.D. 1
| 
| align=center| 3
| align=center| 5:00
| Tokyo, Japan
| 
|-
| Win
| align=center| 8–5–1
| Rafles la Rose
| Submission (triangle choke)
| Shooto - Renaxis 5
| 
| align=center| 1
| align=center| 2:17
| Osaka, Japan
| 
|-
| Loss
| align=center| 7–5–1
| Dave Menne
| Decision (unanimous)
| SB 13 - SuperBrawl 13
| 
| align=center| 3
| align=center| 5:00
| Honolulu, Hawaii, United States
| 
|-
| Loss
| align=center| 7–4–1
| Tetsuji Kato
| Decision (unanimous)
| Shooto - 10th Anniversary Event
| 
| align=center| 3
| align=center| 5:00
| Yokohama, Japan
| 
|-
| Win
| align=center| 7–3–1
| Pat Miletich
| Technical Submission (triangle choke)
| SB 11 - SuperBrawl 11
| 
| align=center| 1
| align=center| 9:22
| Honolulu, Hawaii, United States
| 
|-
| Win
| align=center| 6–3–1
| Koichi Tanaka
| Submission (triangle choke)
| Shooto - Shooter's Dream
| 
| align=center| 1
| align=center| 3:56
| Tokyo, Japan
| 
|-
| Loss
| align=center| 5–3–1
| Hayato Sakurai
| Decision (unanimous)
| Shooto - Las Grandes Viajes 3
| 
| align=center| 3
| align=center| 5:00
| Tokyo, Japan
| 
|-
| Win
| align=center| 5–2–1
| Jay R. Palmer
| Submission (rear naked choke)
| Shooto - Las Grandes Viajes 1
| 
| align=center| 1
| align=center| 3:51
| Tokyo, Japan
| 
|-
| Win
| align=center| 4–2–1
| Steve Nelson
| Submission (triangle choke)
| VTJ 1997 - Vale Tudo Japan 1997
| 
| align=center| 2
| align=center| 5:31
| Tokyo, Japan
| 
|-
| Win
| align=center| 3–2–1
| Tetsuji Kato
| Submission (armbar)
| Shooto - Reconquista 3
| 
| align=center| 3
| align=center| 4:56
| Tokyo, Japan
| 
|-
|  Draw
| align=center| 2–2–1
| Akihiro Gono
| Draw
| Shooto - Gig
| 
| align=center| 3
| align=center| 5:00
| Tokyo, Japan
| 
|-
| Loss
| align=center| 2–2
| Susumu Yamasaki
| Decision (majority)
| Daidojuku - WARS 4
| 
| align=center| 3
| align=center| 3:00
| Tokyo, Japan
| 
|-
| Loss
| align=center| 2–1
| Alex Cook
| Submission (rear naked choke)
| Shooto - Let's Get Lost
| 
| align=center| 2
| align=center| 1:50
| Tokyo, Japan
| 
|-
| Win
| align=center| 2–0
| Naoto Kojima
| Submission (rear naked choke)
| Shooto - Vale Tudo Junction 2
| 
| align=center| 2
| align=center| 1:42
| Tokyo, Japan
| 
|-
| Win
| align=center| 1–0
| Yasunori Okuda
| TKO (punches)
| Shooto - Vale Tudo Junction 1
| 
| align=center| 1
| align=center| 1:18
| Tokyo, Japan
|

Kickboxing record 

|-
|
|Win
| Takuya Watanabe
|Shootboxing "S" of the World
|Tokyo, Japan
|Decision (unanimous)
|align="center"|3
|align="center"|3:00
|1-0
|-
| colspan=9 | Legend:

References

External links

 

Japanese male mixed martial artists
Welterweight mixed martial artists
Mixed martial artists utilizing shootfighting
Mixed martial artists utilizing judo
Mixed martial artists utilizing Brazilian jiu-jitsu
Japanese practitioners of Brazilian jiu-jitsu
People awarded a black belt in Brazilian jiu-jitsu
Japanese male judoka
Sportspeople from Kanagawa Prefecture
People from Yokosuka, Kanagawa
1970 births
Living people
Deep (mixed martial arts) champions
Ultimate Fighting Championship male fighters